Andy de Groat (November 1947 – January 10, 2019) was an American choreographer best known for his collaborations with interdisciplinary impresario Robert Wilson.

Early life and education
Born in November 1947 in Paterson, New Jersey, de Groat grew up in a working-class family with little involvement in the arts. His father, a truck driver, was unsupportive of his interests, and Mr. de Groat had little contact with his family after leaving high school. He was studying painting at the School of Visual Arts in New York when he met Mr. Wilson in late 1966 at the Bleecker Street Cinema in Greenwich Village, where de Groat had a part-time job.

Career
De Groat started his career in 1972, where he choreographed the plays Ouverture at that year's Shiraz Arts Festival. He also helped to choreograph Le Regard du Deaf and Einstein on the Beach at the 1976 Festival d'Avignon. He created the Red Notes dancing company in New York City in 1973. He created two ballets titled Red Notes and Fan Dance.

In 1982, de Groat moved his dance company to France. Henceforth he lived in Paris, Tarbes, and Montauban. He specialized in spinning, and applied it to works such as The Nutcracker, La Bayadère, and Giselle.

Personal life
He was romantically involved with Robert Wilson for many years. Almost 20 years prior to his death, de Groat had a stroke impairing his movement and speech.

Choreographic works
 Fan Dance (1978)
 Stabat Mater (1991)
 La Bayadère (1993)
 Tangos (1995)
 Swan Lake (1996)
 The Nutcracker (1996)
 Igitur or Elbehnon's Folly (2009)

References

1947 births
2019 deaths
American choreographers
American expatriates in France
Date of birth missing
People from Paterson, New Jersey